The Hunger Games: Mockingjay may refer to:

The Hunger Games: Mockingjay – Part 1, the first part of the two-part film
The Hunger Games: Mockingjay – Part 2, the second part of the two-part film

See also
Mockingjay, the Suzanne Collins novel upon which both aforementioned films are based

The Hunger Games